Huntley is a census-designated place (CDP) in Yellowstone County, Montana, United States. The population was 411 at the 2000 census. Huntley lent its name to the Huntley Project, a federal irrigation project that began delivering water to the arid district in 1907. Today, Huntley is an eastern suburb of Billings and is located east of Shepherd and west of Worden.

History

This settlement in arid Crow Indian country was named for S.O. Huntley, a partner in the stagecoach firm of Clark & Huntley. It was located at the head of navigation on the Yellowstone River. The first steamboat, the packet Josephine, arrived June 6, 1875, but river trade was infrequent. A U.S. post office was established in March 1878. The 1880 Census found only 37 people living in Huntley.

Surveying for a railroad led to the so-called "Baker Battle" between Sioux Indians and Army engineers in 1872. The Northern Pacific Railroad arrived in 1882, connecting the town to the new city of Billings. Three years later the town called "Huntley Station" had two stores, a hotel, and a blacksmith. German immigrants were prominent among the new settlers, who established Lutheran and German Methodist churches.

In 1905 the United States Bureau of Reclamation began an irrigation project, called the Huntley Project, on lands that had been part of the Crow Indian Reservation until 1904. The town of Huntley was incorporated into the project along with the new railroad towns of Ballantine, Worden, and Pompey's Pillar, all founded in 1907.

During the Yellowstone Flood of 1937, the damage to Huntley was more extensive, percentage-wise, than in any other community in the region. Much of the original town of Huntley was destroyed and significant portions of the land it occupied was claimed or compromised by the Yellowstone River. The flood damage included washing away the suspension bridge that allowed adjacent Highway 312 to cross the river. After the flood, the site of the town was relocated from the north side of the river to the higher elevation on the south bank.

Geography
Huntley is located at  (45.899722, -108.304491).

Climate

According to the Köppen Climate Classification system, Huntley has a cold semi-arid climate, abbreviated "BSk" on climate maps.

Demographics

As of the census of 2000, there were 411 people, 160 households, and 108 families residing in the CDP. The population density was 319.2 people per square mile (123.0/km2). There were 164 housing units at an average density of 127.4 per square mile (49.1/km2). The racial makeup of the CDP was 97.32% White, 0.24% Native American, 0.24% Asian, 2.19% from other races. Hispanic or Latino of any race were 3.16% of the population.

There were 160 households, out of which 39.4% had children under the age of 18 living with them, 53.8% were married couples living together, 9.4% had a female householder with no husband present, and 31.9% were non-families. 26.9% of all households were made up of individuals, and 11.3% had someone living alone who was 65 years of age or older. The average household size was 2.57 and the average family size was 3.13.

In the CDP, the population was spread out, with 32.1% under the age of 18, 3.4% from 18 to 24, 29.4% from 25 to 44, 22.4% from 45 to 64, and 12.7% who were 65 years of age or older. The median age was 38 years. For every 100 females, there were 99.5 males. For every 100 females age 18 and over, there were 97.9 males.

The median income for a household in the CDP was $36,125, and the median income for a family was $36,750. Males had a median income of $31,250 versus $21,875 for females. The per capita income for the CDP was $13,913. About 12.9% of families and 11.5% of the population were below the poverty line, including 15.4% of those under age 18 and none of those age 65 or over.

Economy

Huntley's economy is based primarily on agriculture, including yam farming, sugar beets, corn, wheat, and barley.

Notable people
 Richard R. "Dick" Jones (1910–2008), a trucking executive and Wyoming Republican politician
 Monica Lindeen, former member of the Montana House of Representatives

References

External links
 Bureau of Reclamation - Huntley Project
 Huntley Project Museum of Irrigated Agriculture
 Yellowstone County Towns, Train Stations & Post Offices, rootsweb.com

Census-designated places in Montana
Census-designated places in Yellowstone County, Montana
Billings metropolitan area